Ève-Mary Thaï Thi Lac (born February 6, 1972) is a former Canadian politician. She served as a member of Parliament for the Bloc Québécois in the riding of Saint-Hyacinthe—Bagot from 2007 to 2011. She was the first Vietnamese Canadian ever elected to the Canadian House of Commons.

Early life
Born in Vietnam to a Cham family, Thi Lac was adopted at age two by a Quebec family and grew up on a farm near Acton Vale.

Career
Prior to her election, she worked for her predecessor, Yvan Loubier, as an executive assistant in his constituency office.

Political career
She was elected to the House of Commons of Canada on September 17, 2007, as the Bloc Québécois candidate in the Saint-Hyacinthe—Bagot by-election, defeating the Conservative candidate Bernard Barré.

She acknowledged that racism was a factor at the outset of her campaign, but stressed her local roots by joking that having grown up on a farm, she was the only candidate in the race who knew how to castrate a pig. She later credited her willingness to simply talk to people as her most effective strategy:

She was re-elected in the 2008 election, but was defeated in the 2011 election by Marie-Claude Morin of the New Democratic Party.

Electoral record

References

External links
 

1972 births
Living people
Bloc Québécois MPs
Women members of the House of Commons of Canada
Francophone Quebec people
Members of the House of Commons of Canada from Quebec
People from Saint-Hyacinthe
Vietnamese emigrants to Canada
Canadian politicians of Vietnamese descent
Women in Quebec politics
21st-century Canadian politicians
21st-century Canadian women politicians